Tsubasa: Reservoir Chronicle, a manga by Clamp, has been adapted into four different anime versions between 2005 and 2009, including a two-season anime television series, an anime film, and two original video animation (OVA) series with screenplay provided by Nanase Ohkawa and music composed by Yuki Kajiura. Bee Train adapted the manga series into a fifty-two-episode anime entitled Tsubasa Chronicle directed by Kōichi Mashimo with Hiroshi Morioka joining on as co-director for season two. Hiroyuki Kawasaki scripted both seasons. Production I.G adapted the manga series into both an anime film entitled Tsubasa Chronicle the Movie: The Princess of the Country of Birdcages directed by Itsuro Kawasaki and two OVA adaptations directed by Shunsuke Tada entitled Tsubasa Tokyo Revelations and Tsubasa Shunraiki. Set in a fictional universe involving alternative realities, the story follows a group of five travellers—Syaoran, Sakura, Kurogane, Fai D. Flourite, and Mokona—as they search for fragments of Sakura's memory that take the form of feathers of great power and without which, Sakura will die. The series features much crossover with its sister series xxxHolic, another manga by Clamp.

The first season of the anime series aired on NHK between April 9, 2005 and October 15, 2005 spanning twenty-six episode. The anime film aired in Japanese theaters on August 20, 2005. The second season of the anime series aired on NHK between April 29, 2006 and November 4, 2006 spanning twenty-six episodes. The first OVA was released between November 16, 2007 and March 17, 2008 spanning three episodes. The second OVA was released between March 17, 2009 and May 15, 2009 spanning two episodes.

The two seasons of the anime series were dubbed by the anime television network Animax under the title Chronicle of the Wings and later began broadcast on April 6, 2006 across its English-language networks in Southeast Asia and South Asia as well as its other networks in Taiwan and Hong Kong. Funimation Entertainment licensed both seasons of the anime for English-language release in North America under the name Tsubasa: Reservoir Chronicle. Funimation has also released the first season of the anime in the United Kingdom through Revelation Films. Revelation Films had confirmed the release of the second season of Tsubasa Chronicle in the U.K. but no release dates were ever confirmed.

Tsubasa: Reservoir Chronicle

Season 1 (2005)

Season 2 (2006)

Distribution

Japanese
The adaptations were originally released in Japan across twenty Region 2 DVDs between 2005 and 2009 by Bandai Visual. The anime series Tsubasa Chronicle was released across fourteen DVDs between August 26, 2005 and February 23, 2007. Shochiku released the anime film Tsubasa the Movie: The Princess in the Country of Birdcages in one DVD on February 25, 2006. The first OVA series Tsubasa Tokyo Revelations was released across three DVDs bundled with the limited versions of volumes 21, 22 and 23 of the manga released between November 16, 2007 and March 17, 2008. The second OVA series Tsubasa Shunraiki was released across two DVDs bundled with the limited versions of the volume 26 and 27 of the manga released on March 17, 2009 and May 15, 2009 respectively.

English
Funimation Entertainment released the series in both North America and the United Kingdom. In North America, Funimation released the two seasons of the anime series across twelve Region 1 DVD compilations between May 22, 2007 and March 17, 2009. Funimation released the DVDs in two collections each containing six of the DVDs together in a boxset on November 11, 2008 and December 29, 2009. Funimation also released the anime film alongside its sister series' corresponding film xxxHolic: A Midsummer Night's Dream as a double feature DVD on February 19, 2008. In the United Kingdom, Funimation released the first season of the anime across six Region 2 DVD compilations through Revelation Films between September 17, 2007 and March 16, 2009. Funimation released those six DVDs in a single boxset on March 16, 2009. In Australia and New Zealand, Madman Entertainment released the two seasons of the anime across twelve Region 4 DVD compilations between September 12, 2007 and June 24, 2009. Madman released the DVDs in two collections each containing six of the DVDs together in a boxset on November 12, 2008 and December 16, 2009.

References

Episodes
Tsubasa Chronicle